Telipna acraeoides is a butterfly in the family Lycaenidae. It is found in the Republic of the Congo, the Democratic Republic of the Congo and north-western Angola.

References

Butterflies described in 1890
Poritiinae
Taxa named by Henley Grose-Smith
Taxa named by William Forsell Kirby
Butterflies of Africa